The 1961–62 Divizia A was the forty-fourth season of Divizia A, the top-level football league of Romania.

Teams

League table

Results

Top goalscorers

Champion squad

See also 

 1961–62 Divizia B

References

Liga I seasons
Romania
1961–62 in Romanian football